Franklin D. Roosevelt served four terms as President of the United States. Franklin D. Roosevelt's cabinet may refer to:

1st and 2nd terms
3rd and 4th terms